Lord Cochrane can refer to:

William Cochrane, 1st Earl of Dundonald who prior to receiving the earldom was created Baron Cochrane of Dundonald
Thomas Cochrane, 10th Earl of Dundonald (1775–1860), Scottish naval officer
Earl of Dundonald has a subsidiary of Baron Cochrane of Paisley and Ochiltree
Baron Cochrane of Cults of Crawford Priory in the County of Fife. Created in 1919, it is a title in the Peerage of the United Kingdom.